Barbodes aurotaeniatus is a species of cyprinid fish native to the Mekong River and Chao Phraya River as well as smaller coastal drainage systems that flow into the Gulf of Thailand.  This species can reach a length of  TL.

References 

Barbodes
Fish described in 1885
Taxa named by Gilbert Tirant